The year 1782 in architecture involved some significant events.

Buildings

 Holy Trinity Church, Warsaw, designed by Szymon Bogumił Zug, is completed.
 Havana Cathedral is consecrated.
 Hôtel de Mademoiselle de Condé town house in Paris, designed by Alexandre-Théodore Brongniart, is completed (approximate date).
 Hôtel de Salm town house in Paris, designed by Pierre Rousseau, is built.
 Amphithéâtre Anglais in Paris opened.
 Royal Swedish Opera in Stockholm, designed by Carl Fredrik Adelcrantz, is opened.
 Frankfurter National-Theater in Frankfurt in Hesse, designed by Johann Andreas Hardt Lieb, is opened.
 Nottingham General Hospital in England, designed by John Simpson, is opened to patients.
 Kurfürstlicher Pavillon at Schönbusch (Aschaffenburg) in Bavaria, designed by Emanuel Herigoyen, is completed.
 Lohn Estate house in the Swiss canton of Bern is designed by Carl Ahasver von Sinner.
 Oxenfoord Castle in Scotland is rebuilt to designs by Robert Adam.

Events
 May 6 – Construction of Grand Palace and Front Palace in Bangkok begins.

Awards
 Grand Prix de Rome, architecture: Pierre Bernard.

Births
 August 15 – James Smith of Jordanhill, Scottish merchant, antiquarian and architect (died 1867)
 Kazimierz Jelski, Polish architect and sculptor (died 1867)

Deaths
 January 4 – Ange-Jacques Gabriel, French architect (born 1698)
 June 18 – John Wood, the Younger, English architect working in Bath (born 1728)
 June 26 – Antonio Visentini, Venetian architect, painter and engraver (born 1688)

References

Architecture
Years in architecture
18th-century architecture